Hebgen Lake is a reservoir created by the Hebgen Dam, located in Gallatin County in southwest Montana. It is well known for the 1959 Hebgen Lake earthquake (magnitude 7.1 to 7.5) which occurred nearby on August 17, 1959, forming Quake Lake, which is located immediately downstream.

Recreation
Hebgen Lake and the surrounding area offer many recreational activities: camping, fishing, boating, and hiking. Campgrounds include Rainbow Point and Cherry Creek. Rainbow Point is the largest campground on the lake, offering four "loops." Each loop contains approximately 20 campsites. Each campsite can accommodate a full-size camper and one or two vehicles.

See also
 Firehole Ranch
 Quake Lake 
 Yellowstone Caldera

Images

References

External links

Hebgen Lake Bathymetric Map Montana Fish, Wildlife & Parks 

Bodies of water of Gallatin County, Montana
Reservoirs in Montana
Protected areas of Gallatin County, Montana
Gallatin National Forest